Nicholas Jennings (18 January 1946 – 4 June 2016) was an English professional footballer whose 15-year career ran from the early 1960s to the mid-1970s.

Born in Wellington, Somerset he played nearly 100 league games for his first club Plymouth Argyle. In all he made over 200 appearances for Pompey (and 4 during a loan spell at Aldershot) before moving to Exeter on a free transfer in the 1974 close season, making his final league appearance in 1978. Jennings also played the summer of 1973 in the NASL with the Dallas Tornado. He was named an All-Star Honorable Mention and help Dallas to the league final, which they lost 0–2.

Jennings died on Saturday 4 June 2016 at the age of 70.

References

1946 births
2016 deaths
English footballers
People from Wellington, Somerset
Plymouth Argyle F.C. players
Portsmouth F.C. players
Aldershot F.C. players
Exeter City F.C. players
Dallas Tornado players
North American Soccer League (1968–1984) players
English Football League players
Association football midfielders
English expatriate sportspeople in the United States
Expatriate soccer players in the United States
English expatriate footballers